The following table shows the women's heptathlon world record progression starting in 1978 and ratified by the IAAF from June 1981. The first score in the table indicates the score using the tables in use at the time, the second score is based on tables currently in use.

Record progression

See also
 Men's heptathlon world record progression

References

Heptathlon, women
World record